Frank Briggs (1 February 1917 – 11 April 1984) was an English footballer who played for Port Vale, Aston Villa, Wrexham, and Watford (as a guest).

Career
Briggs joined Port Vale in December 1937, at the age of 20. He played a mere eight Third Division North games in the 1937–38 season before being released from The Old Recreation Ground in May 1938. He moved on to Aston Villa in May 1938. He later played for Wrexham. He also guested for Watford during the Second World War.

Career statistics
Source:

References

Footballers from Salford
English footballers
Association football midfielders
Port Vale F.C. players
Aston Villa F.C. players
Wrexham A.F.C. players
English Football League players
Watford F.C. wartime guest players
1917 births
1984 deaths